The Esplanade metro station is a station of the Kolkata Metro. The station is located in the Esplanade neighbourhood of Kolkata, at the northern end of Chowringhee Road/Jawaharlal Nehru Road near New Market and the Oberoi Grand hotel. It opened in 1984 as part of what is now Kolkata Metro Line 1.  The station is being re-designed to be the largest station of the metro and will function as the interchange station between Line 1, Line 2 and Line 3.

The station

Structure
Esplanade is underground interchange metro station for the Line 1, Line 2 and Line 3 of Kolkata Metro.

Layout

See also 
 Transport in Kolkata

Other Wikimedia projects

References

External links
 kolmetro
 UrbanRail.Net – descriptions of all metro systems in the world, each with a schematic map showing all stations.

Kolkata Metro stations
Railway stations in Kolkata
Railway stations opened in 1984